Radu Eduard Ciobanu (born 1 September 1975) is a Romanian former footballer who played as a centre back.

Playing in his first years for Aerostar Bacău, Ciobanu was transferred to FCM Bacău, where he played for ten years in the first two football leagues of Romania. His contract expired in 2004, and spent a year without a team. Ciobanu returned in Romanian football at the age of 30, signing a contract with Politehnica Iaşi.

External links
 
 

1975 births
Living people
Romanian footballers
Association football defenders
Liga I players
Liga II players
CS Aerostar Bacău players
FCM Bacău players
FC Politehnica Iași (1945) players
Sportspeople from Bacău